Pengiran Mohamed (born 8 January 1961) is a Bruneian professional darts player who currently playing in British Darts Organisation events. He qualified for the 2018 BDO World Darts Championship.

Career
Mohamed reached the Last 136 of the 2010 World Masters. He attempted to qualify for the 2011 BDO World Darts Championship but lost in the Preliminary round. In 2017, Mohamed qualified for the 2018 BDO World Darts Championship after winning the Asian qualifier at the Federal Hotel in Bukit Bintang, Kuala Lumpur, he will be the first player from Brunei to compete at the BDO World Darts Championship. In an interview he said, "I will continue my training in preparation for London because the players there are difficult to play against. I have to be prepared both mentally and physically. My hope is to succeed in BDO for the first time for Asia even though it is difficult but if we are determined and confident we can succeed."

World Championship results

BDO
 2018: Preliminary Round (lost to Gary Robson 0-3)

External links
 Pengiram Mohamed's profile and stats on Darts Database

References

Living people
British Darts Organisation players
Bruneian darts player
1961 births